North Klaten is a kecamatan (or district) in Java, Indonesia.

References

Klaten Regency
Districts of Central Java